This is the 2005–06 season in review for the Professional Bowlers Association (PBA) Tour. It was the Tour's 47th season and consisted of 22 events.

Season highlights
 Sean Rash became the first bowler to win a title from a non-exempt position by defeating Mike DeVaney in the West Virginia Championship.
 Current PBA Hall of Famer Del Ballard Jr. made his first televised appearance since 1997 in the Motel 6 Phoenix Classic, but was thwarted of his 14th title (and first since the 1993 U.S. Open) by Ritchie Allen.
 Mike Scroggins won his third PBA title and first career major at the USBC Masters.
 Walter Ray Williams Jr. tied Earl Anthony's then-record of 41 PBA titles when he emerged victorious in the Denny's PBA World Championship.
 Tommy Jones earned PBA Player of the Year honors, becoming the second bowler to win both PBA Rookie of the Year and Player of the Year awards in a career (joining Mike Aulby). Jones won four titles on the season, including the 63rd U.S. Open.
 Two PBA Tour Trial events were held during the season.  The first event saw Chris Loschetter, Brian Kretzer and D.J. Archer advance to the exempt field, while the second event was headlined by Kelly Kulick's PBA exemption, making her the first woman to ever capture full-time active membership in the PBA.

Awards and leaders
Player Of The Year: Tommy Jones
Rookie Of The Year: Bill O'Neill
Steve Nagy Sportsmanship Award: Jack Jurek
Money Leader: Tommy Jones ($301,700)
High Average Award: Norm Duke (224.29)

Tournament results
 Majors are noted in boldface.

References

External links
2005–06 Season Schedule

Professional Bowlers Association seasons
2005 in bowling
2006 in bowling